Clément Chevrier (born 29 June 1992 in Amiens) is a French former professional cyclist, who rode professionally between 2014 and 2020, for the ,  and  teams. Upon retiring, Chevrier announced his intention to become a sommelier.

Major results

2010
 5th Overall Tre Ciclistica Bresciana
1st Stage 2
2012
 7th Piccolo Giro di Lombardia
2013
 2nd Overall Tour des Pays de Savoie
1st Stage 4
 3rd Overall Giro della Valle d'Aosta
 9th Piccolo Giro di Lombardia
 10th Overall Ronde de l'Isard
2014
 1st Overall San Dimas Stage Race
 1st  Young rider classification USA Pro Cycling Challenge

Grand Tour general classification results timeline

References

External links

 
 
 

1992 births
Living people
French male cyclists
Sportspeople from Amiens
Université Savoie-Mont Blanc alumni
Cyclists from Hauts-de-France
21st-century French people